Lhakpa Sherpa (also Lakpa) (born 1973) is a Nepalese Sherpa mountain climber. She has climbed Mount Everest ten times, the most of any woman in the world. Her record-breaking tenth climb was on May 12, 2022, which she financed via a crowd-funding campaign. In 2000, she became the first Nepali woman to climb and descend Everest successfully. In 2016, she was listed as one of BBC's 100 Women.

Early life 
Lhakpa Sherpa was born in a cave in the region, and had no formal education.  She grew up in Balakharka, a village in the Makalu, Nepal region of the Himalayas. She is one of 11 children, and is a single mother of two daughters and a son herself.

Career 
In 2000 she was the leader of an expedition sponsored by Asian Trekking. On September 18, 2000 she became the first Nepali woman to summit Mount Everest and survive (see also Pasang Lhamu Sherpa). This climb was with the Nepali Women Millennium Expedition.

In 2003, the U.S. PBS noted that she had summited Mount Everest three times, the most for a woman. In May 2003 she reached the summit with her sister and brother; Ming Kipa and Mingma Gelu.

By 2007 Lhakpa Sherpa had summited Everest six times since 1999 and her husband summited nine. That year they hosted a presentation about their 2007 Everest trip, with donations taken for Quaker Lane Cooperative Nursery School. George and Lhakpa summited Mount Everest 5 times together.

In 2016 she summited Mount Everest from Tibet (China), making her seventh summit. The president of Mount Everest Summiteers' Association, a Nepali women and high-altitude worker Maya Sherpa also summited, but from Nepal. Maya Sherpa is another record-setting Nepali woman, and she has also summited K2.

Climbing career achievements 
Everest summitings:
 2000
 2001
 2003
 2004
 2005
 2006
 2016
 2017
 2018
 2022

Additional expeditions:
 Expedition to climb K2 in 2010, did not summit but made it to camp 3 before being turned back by bad weather
 Expedition to Everest in 2015; made it to base camp in Tibet, but turned back by the Spring earthquakes in the Himalayas (see also 2015 Mount Everest avalanches and/or April 2015 Nepal earthquake)

Personal life 
Lhakpa is named for the day of the week she was born on (Wednesday). Although born in Nepal, she is now a U.S. resident and works at taking care of her three children and various jobs. She has worked at the U.S. store 7 Eleven. She worked at Whole Foods Market.

However, in interviews she noted her desire for the mountain, a condition previously seen in such climbers as George Mallory and Yuichiro Miura according to U.K media outlet The Daily Telegraph.

She has two daughters and one son, and was married to George Dijmarescu, a Romanian-American, for 12 years. They met in 2000 in Kathmandu, Nepal and got married in 2002. In 2008 George got cancer, which combined with medical bills was noted as one of the factors that created tension in their marriage. The marriage came apart in 2012 when Dijmarescu became violent, and beat Lhakpa Sherpa to the point she was taken to the emergency room; a hospital social worker placed her and her two girls in a local shelter where they stayed for eight months.

In 2016, she began again receiving recognition in various news arenas as the woman with the most Everest summitings, and completed her seventh summit that year.

Family and relationships 
Her little sister Mingma reached the summit of Mount Everest on May 22, 2003 when she was 15 years old (she climbed with Lhakpa and Gelu), thus becoming the youngest woman and person known to have summited Mount Everest (see also Temba Tsheri and Jordan Romero). Her brother is Mingma Gelu Sherpa and is noted to have reached the summit of Mount Everest eight times by 2016. The BBC noted that when three of them reached the summit together in 2003, that was the first group of three siblings on the summit at the same time, as recognized by the Guinness Book of World Records.

On the 2004 Connecticut Everest Expedition her then-husband Dijmarescu struck Lhakpa. According to Michael Kodas, a journalist present during the expedition, Dijmarescu, "hook[ed] a blow with his right hand to the side of his wife's head." This altercation "sparked a sort of media sensation in the mountaineering world".

See also
 Apa Sherpa
 Chhurim
 Lakpa Gelu
 List of Mount Everest records
 List of Mount Everest summiters by number of times to the summit
 Shriya Shah-Klorfine (Canadian woman who died on descent of Everest)
 List of 20th-century summiters of Mount Everest

References

Living people
Nepalese summiters of Mount Everest
1973 births
BBC 100 Women
People from Sankhuwasabha District
Sherpa summiters of Mount Everest
Nepalese mountain climbers
Nepalese emigrants to the United States
Nepalese female mountain climbers